Lophopogonius is a monotypic beetle genus in the family Cerambycidae described by Linsley in 1935. Its only species, Lophopogonius crinitus, was described by John Lawrence LeConte in 1873.

References

Pogonocherini
Beetles described in 1873
Monotypic beetle genera